Jazz Sahib is an album by American jazz saxophonist Sahib Shihab recorded in 1957 for the Savoy label.

Reception

The Allmusic review by Ron Wynn states: "This excellent reissue spotlights great groups Sahib worked with in late 50s".

Track listing
All compositions by Sahib Shihab, except where indicated.
 "S.M.T.W.T.F.S.S. Blues" - 4:56   
 "Jamila" - 5:33   
 "The Moors" (Melba Liston) - 7:19   
 "Blu-a-Round" - 10:17   
 "Le' Sneak" - 5:49   
 "Ballad to the East" (Liston) - 4:41   
 "Ba-Dut-Du-Dat" (Liston) - 5:59 Bonus track on CD reissue

Note
Recorded at Van Gelder Studio in Hackensack, New Jersey on July 9 (tracks 1-3) and November 7 (tracks 4-7), 1957

Personnel 
Sahib Shihab - baritone saxophone
Phil Woods - alto saxophone
Benny Golson - tenor saxophone
Bill Evans (tracks 4-7), Hank Jones (tracks 1-3) - piano
Paul Chambers (tracks 1-3), Oscar Pettiford (tracks 4-7)  - bass
Art Taylor - drums

References 

1957 albums
Sahib Shihab albums
Savoy Records albums
Albums recorded at Van Gelder Studio
Albums produced by Ozzie Cadena